Korubaşı can refer to:

 Korubaşı, Ayvacık
 Korubaşı, Gazipaşa
 Korubaşı, Taşova